Evelyn Nwabuoku (born 14 November 1985) is a Nigerian footballer who plays as a midfielder for En Avant de Guingamp in the French Division 1 Féminine and the Nigeria women's national football team and she is the captain of the national side. Nwabuoku played previously for BIIK Kazygurt in the Kazakhstani women's football championship and both Bayelsa Queens and Rivers Angels in the Nigerian Women's Championship.

Club career
Nwabuoku played in the Nigerian Women's Championship for Bayelsa Queens and Rivers Angels before moving to BIIK Kazygurt of the Kazakhstani women's football championship in 2015. She subsequently moved to French side En Avant de Guingamp, where she joined up with her sister, and fellow Nigerian international Desire Oparanozie. She helped Nwabuoku with the initial language difficulties and to settle in the area. Nwabuoku made her debut in the victory against league favourites FCF Juvisy, and praised the atmosphere in the Fred-Aubert Stadium.

International career 
She captained the Nigeria women's national football team, nicknamed the "Super Falcons", at the 2015 FIFA Women's World Cup and the 2014 African Women's Championship winning the latter. Nwabuoku said that becoming the captain was "amazing", and that "There is nothing as great as representing and defending the pride of your country." However, she added that the team had underperformed in the previous few years and were looking to improve at the 2017 Africa Cup of Nations. She was also part of the squad at the 2012 African Women's Championship.

Honours

Club
Rivers Angels
 Nigerian Women's Championship: 2014
 Nigerian Women's Cup: 2014

International
Nigeria
 African Women's Championship: 2014

References

External links
 
 
 Player stats  at footofeminin.fr

Rivers Angels F.C. players
Women's association football midfielders
2015 FIFA Women's World Cup players
Nigerian women's footballers
1985 births
Living people
Nigeria women's international footballers
Nigerian expatriate women's footballers
Nigerian expatriate sportspeople in Kazakhstan
Expatriate women's footballers in Kazakhstan
Nigerian expatriate sportspeople in Sweden
Expatriate women's footballers in Sweden
Nigerian expatriate sportspeople in France
Expatriate women's footballers in France
Division 1 Féminine players
En Avant Guingamp (women) players
2019 FIFA Women's World Cup players
Bayelsa Queens F.C. players
BIIK Kazygurt players